Mangrauni is a village in Madhubani district, Bihar, India with a population of 16,533. The village is in the Rajnagar Vidhan Sabha constituency and the local language is Maithili.

References

Villages in Madhubani district